Pneumosinus dilatans is a condition consisting of abnormal expansion or dilatation of one or more paranasal sinuses.  It most often affects the frontal sinus, and can cause damage to vision due to pressure on the nearby optic nerve. The preferred treatment is endoscopic surgery to deflate the sinus.

Sources

External links
 MR/CT scans of pneumosinus dilatans from MedPix

Eye diseases
Human head and neck
Rare diseases
Skeletal disorders